Anton Aleksandrovich Smyslov (born 28 May 1979) is a former Russian professional football player.

Club career
He made his Russian Football National League debut for FC Lokomotiv Chita on 11 May 1999 in a game against PFC Spartak Nalchik. He played 7 seasons in the FNL for Lokomotiv, FC Anzhi Makhachkala, FC Mordovia Saransk and FC Gazovik Orenburg.

External links
 

1979 births
Footballers from Saint Petersburg
Living people
Russian footballers
Association football goalkeepers
FC Anzhi Makhachkala players
FC Mordovia Saransk players
FC Tosno players
FC Zhemchuzhina Sochi players
FC Orenburg players
FC Dynamo Saint Petersburg players
FC Petrotrest players
FC Chita players